The head coach is Heather Linstad. Assisting Linstad are Jaime Totten and Kirsti Anderson. The first time the 2009/10 women's ice hockey team took the ice was at Mark Edward Freitas Ice Forum. It will be in exhibition play against Dawson College on September 25 at 7 p.m. The regular season began on the road at New Hampshire on October 3. UConn's regular season home opener was October 16 against the Syracuse Orange women's ice hockey program at 7 p.m.

Offseason
June 19: Hockey East announced that Connecticut women's ice hockey assistant coach Jaime Totten will be one of three assistants for the Hockey East All-Star team this season. On November 22, the WHEA All-Stars will take on Team USA at New Hampshire's Whittemore Center. She was an assistant coach for the USA Women's National Under-22 team in 2008 during a three-game series against Canada.
 July 2: Heather Linstad announced the incoming freshman class of six student-athletes set to join the Huskies on their 2009-10 campaign. The incoming players are from four states and two provinces the class includes five skaters and one goalie. The players are:
Maude Blain (from Magog, Quebec) was an assistant captain on Team Quebec when the squad earned the bronze medal at the 2007 Canada games and served as a team captain when Team Quebec took silver at the 2007 Canadian Champion.
 Claire Frances (from Stowe, Vermont) earned the starting goaltender spot as a freshman at Stowe High School. As a sophomore, she led the ice hockey team to a runner-up finish at the Vermont State Championships. Stowe was a two-time Vermont High School Coaches and Burlington Free Press all-league honouree.
Kelly Horan (from Methuen, Massachusetts) helped Lawrence Academy to one ISL Championship and the 2007 Harrington Tournament title.
 Casey Knajdek (from Woodbury, Minnesota) was a five-time varsity letterwinner at Hill Murray in women's ice hockey and softball. Knajdek helped her hockey team to three consecutive conference championships while she earned all-conference accolades at the end of each championship season.
Carli Pridmore (from Winnetka, Illinois) will join former teammates Jaclyn Camardo (Arlington Heights, Ill.) and Nicole Camardo (Arlington Heights, Ill.) as a freshman this season. She played with both Camardos on the Chicago Young Americans U19 squad.
Elisabeth Stathopulos (from Toronto, Ontario) played for the Durham Junior Lightning Intermediate AA team, helping the team to the 2007 Ontario Provincial Championship Title.

July 20: Rebecca Hewett is among the 42 players invited to Hockey Canada's National Women's Under-22 Team selection camp held August 7–14 in Calgary, Alberta.
August 19: Heather Linstad announced the addition of Kirsti Anderson to this season's coaching staff. Anderson spent the last two season as an assistant with Hamilton College’s women's ice hockey program.

Regular season
January: Alexandra Garcia was between the pipes for every game of the undefeated month of January (9-0-1) for the Huskies. She had a 1.09 GAA and a .951 save-percentage. Garcia capped off the month with back-to-back shutouts at Boston Unoversotu and against Vermont. Garcia finished the month with three shutouts, after denying Robert Morris on Jan. 9. She allowed fewer than two goals in all by one contest in January and made 20 or more saves in six contests.
February 17: Senior defender Cristin Allen is among 45 nominees for the Patty Kazmaier Memorial Award.
During the month of February, Elizabeth Stathopulos registered four assists. On February 27, she assisted on the game-winning goal that beat Boston College. During February, she led all Huskies freshmen with five points. She finished her month with a rating of +3.

Standings

Roster

Schedule

Player stats

Skaters

Goaltenders

Postseason
March 7: Connecticut moves to the Hockey East Tournament championship game. The Huskies had a  three-goal first period and did not look back. The Huskies eliminated the top-seeded Providence Friars at Schneider Arena. Alexandra Garcia stopped 32 shots. The Huskies are in the Hockey East championship game for the second time in conference history. This is the Huskies first appearance in the championship since 2005.

March 8:Sophomore Tara Watchorn scored at 9:52 in overtime as Number 3 seeded BU defeated No. 5 seed Connecticut. The game was played at Schneider Arena on the Providence College campus. The Terriers clinched their first ever Hockey East Tournament title and earned a spot in the NCAA Tournament. The 2010 Hockey East Tournament Championship game was the first ever to go into overtime in the eight-year history of the league. Connecticut did not receive an at-large berth.

Awards and honors
 Cristin Allen, Best Defenseman Award
 Cristin Allen, Runner up, Hockey East Player of the Year
 Cristin Allen, New England Hockey Writers All-Star Team 
 Jennifer Chaisson - Hockey East Best Defensive Forward
 Alexandra Garcia – Connecticut, Bauer Goaltender of the Month, January 2010
 Alexandra Garcia, Runner Up, Hockey East Goaltending Champion

All Hockey East Team
 Cristin Allen, 2010 WHEA First-Team All-Star
 Alexandra Garcia, 2010 WHEA Honorable Mention All-Star
 Jody Sydor, 2010 WHEA Honorable Mention All-Star
 Monique Weber, 2010 WHEA Honorable Mention All-Star

Hockey East All Tournament team
Cristin Allen, D: 2010 Women's Hockey East All-Tournament Team
Michelle Binning, F: 2010 Women's Hockey East All-Tournament Team
Amy Hollstein, F: 2010 Women's Hockey East All-Tournament Team

See also
2009–10 Connecticut Huskies women's basketball team

References

External links
Official site

Connecticut
UConn Huskies women's ice hockey seasons
Connect
Connect